Caryn Tyson (born February 15, 1963) is a Republican member of the Kansas Senate, representing the 12th district since 2013. She succeeded Republican Senator Pat Apple, who chose to run in the newly redistricted 37th district, winning that seat. She was previously a member of the Kansas House of Representatives, representing District 4 from 2011 to 2013. Tyson is a fifth generation Kansan from Parker, Kansas. She earned two Bachelor of Science degrees (Mathematics and Computer Science) from Kansas State University before completing a Master of Science in Engineering Management from the University of Kansas. Before her time in the public sphere, she worked in the IT field for over 24 years. Her work included space shuttle support for NASA.

Tyson was a Republican candidate for Kansas's 2nd congressional district. In a crowded field, she finished a close second to the eventual general election winner, Steve Watkins.

Kansas Senate 
Tyson is a Republican member of the Kansas Senate, where she has represented the 12th District since 2013. As a member of the Kansas Senate, Tyson served on a number of committees. She served as the Chair of the Assessment and Taxation Committee.

Committee Membership 
 Assessment and Taxation (Chair)
 Federal and State Affairs
 Transportation
 Ways and Means
 Education
 Natural Resources

Sponsored Legislation 
 SB101 - Amending the protection from abuse act and protection from stalking act to establish the protection
 SB45 - Authorizing the carrying of concealed handguns without a license under the personal and family protection act
 SB95 - Creating the Kansas unborn child protection from dismemberment abortion act

Electoral history

2018 2nd Congressional District Primary 
On August 24, 2017, Tyson formally announced her campaign for Kansas's 2nd congressional district. Tyson was endorsed by the Kansas Farm Bureau, Kansans for Life, the Susan B. Anthony List, Maggie's List, and the Madison Project.

References

External links 
State Page
Campaign Website

1963 births
21st-century American politicians
21st-century American women politicians
Republican Party Kansas state senators
Kansas State University alumni
Living people
People from Linn County, Kansas
Women state legislators in Kansas